Mujeres casadas is a black and white film from Argentina directed by Mario Soffici on the script by Sixto Pondal Ríos and Carlos Olivari that was released on April 12, 1954 starring Elina Colomer, Ana Lasalle, Francisco Martínez Allende, Nelly Panizza and Jorge Rivier.

References 

1954 films
Argentine black-and-white films
1950s Argentine films